Gianchetti (also bianchetti) are the whitebait of the pesce azzurro of the Mediterranean (sardines and anchovies, etc.), caught with special nets in the early months of the year. The relatively low catch means that the prices at market are rather high, even in comparison to other whitebait. Since the 1990s frozen gianchetti have also been available.

A speciality of the Ligurian cuisine, gianchetti are generally lightly boiled in salted water and served hot, dressed with oil and lemon juice; another classic approach is to make fritters of the fish together with an egg and flour batter; finally they may simply be dipped in flour and deep fried.

The gianchetti of a red colour (ruscetti, rossetti) are tougher and scaly to the palate: they are largely used to flavour fish-based sauces.

See also
 Cuisine of Liguria
 List of Italian dishes

Notes

Gallery 

Cuisine of Liguria
Fish dishes